Lombardsville is an unincorporated community in Scioto County, in the U.S. state of Ohio.

History
A post office called Lombardville was established in 1868, and remained in operation until 1903. The community was named for Francis Lombard, a first settler.

References

Unincorporated communities in Scioto County, Ohio
Unincorporated communities in Ohio